Psilocorsis reflexella (dotted leaftier moth) is a species of moth of the family Depressariidae. It is found in North America, including Georgia, Illinois, New Jersey, New York, Oklahoma and Tennessee.

The wingspan is 14–17 mm.

The larvae feed on Quercus species. They skeletonize the leaves of their host plant. The species overwinters in the pupal stage in leaf litter.

References

Moths described in 1860
Psilocorsis